Edmund Lee Gettier III (October 31, 1927 – March 23, 2021) was an American philosopher at the University of Massachusetts Amherst.  He is best known for his short 1963 article "Is Justified True Belief Knowledge?", which has generated an extensive philosophical literature trying to respond to what became known as the Gettier problem.

Life
Edmund Lee Gettier III was born on October 31, 1927, in Baltimore, Maryland.

Gettier obtained his B.A. from Johns Hopkins University in 1949. He earned his PhD in philosophy from Cornell University in 1961 with a dissertation on “Bertrand Russell’s Theories of Belief” written under the supervision of  Norman Malcolm.

Gettier taught philosophy at Wayne State University from 1957 until 1967 initially as an Instructor, then as an assistant professor, and, latterly, as an associate professor. His philosophical colleagues at Wayne State included, amongst others, Alvin Plantinga and Héctor-Neri Castaneda.

In the academic year of 1964–65 he held a postdoctoral Mellon Fellowship at the University of Pittsburgh. His recorded field of research being "Bertrand Russell's theories of belief, and their effect on contemporary thought." Whilst at Pittsburgh he met a young Bas C. Van Fraasen and published his second academic paper, a review of John Passmore's Philosophical Reasoning.

In 1967 Gettier was recruited to the faculty of philosophy at the University of Massachusetts, Amherst, being promoted to full professor there in 1972. He taught there until his retirement, as Professor Emeritus, in 2001.

Gettier died on March 23, 2021, aged 93.

Gettier's fame rests on a three-page article, published in Analysis in 1963 that remains one of the most famous in recent philosophical history. In the same, Gettier challenges the "justified true belief" definition of knowledge that dates back to Plato's Theaetetus, but is discounted at the end of that very dialogue. This account was accepted by most philosophers at the time, most prominently the epistemologist Clarence Irving Lewis and his student Roderick Chisholm. Gettier's article offered counter-examples to this account in the form of cases such that subjects had true beliefs that were also justified, but for which the beliefs were true for reasons unrelated to the justification. Some philosophers, however, thought the account of knowledge as justified true belief had already been questioned in a general way by the work of Wittgenstein. (Later, a similar argument was found in the papers of Bertrand Russell.)

Work

Gettier problem

Gettier provides several examples of beliefs that are both true and justified, but that we should not intuitively term knowledge.  Cases of this sort are now termed "Gettier (counter-)examples". Because Gettier's criticism of the justified true belief model is systemic, other authors have imagined increasingly fantastical counterexamples.  For example: I am watching the men's Wimbledon Final, and John McEnroe is playing Jimmy Connors, it is match point, and McEnroe wins.  I say to myself: "John McEnroe is this year's men's champion at Wimbledon".  Unbeknownst to me, however, the BBC were experiencing a broadcasting fault and so had broadcast a tape of last year's final, when McEnroe also beat Connors.  I had been watching last year's Wimbledon final, so I believed that McEnroe had bested Connors.  But at that same time, in real life, McEnroe was repeating last year's victory and besting Connors!  So my belief that McEnroe bested Connors to become this year's Wimbledon champion is true, and I had good reason to believe so (my belief was justified) — and yet, there is a sense in which I could not really have claimed to "know" that McEnroe had bested Connors because I was only accidentally right that McEnroe beat Connors — my belief was not based on the right kind of justification.

Gettier inspired a great deal of work by philosophers attempting to recover a working definition of knowledge.  Major responses include:
 Gettier's use of "justification" is too general, and only some kinds of justification count.
 Gettier's examples do not count as justification at all, and only some kinds of evidence are justificatory.
 Knowledge must have a fourth condition, such as "no false premises" or "indefeasibility".
 Robert Nozick suggests knowledge must consist of justified true belief that is "truth-tracking" — a belief such that if it was revealed to be false, it would not have been believed, and conversely.
 Colin McGinn suggests that knowledge is atomic (it is not divisible into smaller components). We have knowledge when we have knowledge, and an accurate definition of knowledge may even contain the word "knowledge".

A 2001 study by Weinberg, Nichols, and Stich suggests that the effect of the Gettier problem varies by culture. In particular, people from Western countries seem more likely to agree with the judgments described in the story than do those from East Asia.  Subsequent studies were unable to replicate these results.

Complete works
"Is Justified True Belief Knowledge?" Analysis, Vol. 23, pp. 121–123 (1963). 
"Review: [Untitled]" The Philosophical Review 74, no. 2 (1965): 266–69.  https://doi.org/10.2307/2183277
“Comments on A. J. Ayer’s ‘The Concept of a Person’,” in Intentionality, Minds, and Perception: Discussions on Contemporary Philosophy, ed. Hector-Neri Castañeda (Detroit, 1967).

See also
American philosophy
List of American philosophers

References

External links
 Gettier's paper, "Is Justified True Belief Knowledge?", in English and also in a translation into Hindi

1927 births
2021 deaths
20th-century American non-fiction writers
20th-century American philosophers
20th-century essayists
American male essayists
American male non-fiction writers
American philosophy academics
Analytic philosophers
Cornell University alumni
Epistemologists
Metaphilosophers
Metaphysicians
Ontologists
Philosophers of culture
Philosophers of mind
Philosophers of social science
Philosophy writers
University of Massachusetts Amherst faculty
University of Massachusetts Lowell faculty
Wayne State University faculty
Wittgensteinian philosophers
Writers from Baltimore
20th-century American male writers